William George Algar Orde-Powlett, 5th Baron Bolton JP DL (21 August 1869 – 11 December 1944) was a British peer and Conservative Party politician.

Early life
Orde-Powlett was born on 21 August 1869. He was the eldest son of William Orde-Powlett, 4th Baron Bolton of Bolton Castle (son of William Orde-Powlett, 3rd Baron Bolton) and Lady Algitha Frederica Mary Lumley (the daughter of Richard Lumley, 9th Earl of Scarbrough).

He was educated at Eton College and the Royal Military College, Sandhurst.

Career
He was commissioned as a lieutenant in the Yorkshire Hussars, but resigned the commission in April 1902. The following month he was on 28 May appointed major of the 1st Volunteer Battalion, the Princess of Wales's Own (Yorkshire Regiment). He later served with the Yorkshire Regiment during the First World War and retired with the rank of lieutenant colonel. From 1910 to 1918 he was MP for Richmond.  From 1935 to 1944 he was Lord Lieutenant of the North Riding of Yorkshire

Personal life
On 6 June 1893, he married Hon. Elizabeth Mary Gibson (1871, d. 9 December 1943) at St George's, Hanover Square. She was a daughter of Edward Gibson, 1st Baron Ashbourne and the former Frances Maria Adelaide Colles. Together, they were the parents of:

 Hon. William Percy Orde-Powlett (1894–1915), who was killed in action at the Second Battle of Ypres in May 1915 during World War I.
 Hon. Elaine Letitia Algitha Orde-Powlett (1895–1984), who married Rt. Rev. Percy Mark Herbert, son of Maj.-Gen. William Henry Herbert, in 1922.
 Nigel Amyas Orde-Powlett, 6th Baron Bolton (1900–1963), who married Victoria Mary Villiers, daughter of Henry Montagu Villiers, in 1928.

Lady Bolton died on 9 December 1943 and Lord Bolton died just over a year later on 11 December 1944 at age 75. He was succeeded in the barony by his surviving son, Nigel.

Notes

External links 
 
 Orde-Powlett, William George Algar, (1869-1944), 5th Baron Bolton

1869 births
1944 deaths
People educated at Eton College
Graduates of the Royal Military College, Sandhurst
5
British Army personnel of World War I
Orde Powlett, William
Green Howards officers
Lord-Lieutenants of the North Riding of Yorkshire
Orde Powlett, William
Orde Powlett, William
UK MPs who inherited peerages
Yorkshire Hussars officers